The cheval de frise (plural: chevaux de frise , "Frisian horses") is a defensive obstacle, which existed in a number of forms and were employed in various applications. These included underwater constructions used to prevent the passage of ships or other vessels on rivers, or as anti-cavalry measure consisting of a portable frame (sometimes just a simple log) covered with many projecting long iron or wooden spikes or spears. They were principally intended as an anti-cavalry obstacle but could also be moved quickly to help block a breach in another barrier. They remained in occasional use until they were replaced by wire obstacles just after the American Civil War. During the Civil War, the Confederates used this type of barrier more often than the Union forces. During World War I, armies used chevaux de frise to temporarily plug gaps in barbed wire. Barbed wire chevaux de frise were used in jungle fighting on the South Pacific islands during World War II.

The term is also applied to defensive works on buildings. This includes a series of closely set upright stones found outside the ramparts of Iron Age hillforts in northern Europe, or iron spikes outside homes in Charleston, South Carolina.

Etymology

In French, cheval de frise means "Frisian horse". The Frisians fought predominantly using cavalry; they were known for being formidable horsemen, and Frisian horses were renowned for their strength and agility. Therefore, for defense they relied heavily on anti-cavalry obstacles. The Dutch also adopted the use of these defensive devices when at war with Spain. The term cheval de frise came to be used for any spiked obstacle, such as broken glass embedded in mortar at the top of a wall.

The cheval de frise was adopted in New York and Pennsylvania during the American Revolutionary War as a defensive measure installed on rivers to prevent upriver movement by enemy ships. During the Peninsular War, at the siege of Badajoz in 1812, a cheval de frise was successfully deployed to fill a breach in the town wall, allowing the French to inflict heavy casualties on the British storm troops.

American Revolutionary War

During the American Revolutionary War both Thaddeus Kosciuszko and Robert Erskine designed an anti-ship version of the cheval-de-frise to prevent British warships from proceeding up the Delaware River and Hudson River, respectively. A cheval de frise by Erskine's design was placed between Fort Washington at northern Manhattan and Fort Lee in New Jersey in 1776. The following year construction began on one to the north of West Point at Pollepel Island, but it was overshadowed by the completion of the Great Chain across the Hudson in 1778, which was used through 1782.

Similar devices planned by Ben Franklin and designed by Robert Smith were used in the Delaware River near Philadelphia, between Fort Mifflin and Fort Mercer. Two other lines of chevaux-de-frise were also placed across the Delaware River at Marcus Hook, Pennsylvania and Fort Billingsport, New Jersey as a first line of defense for Philadelphia against the British naval forces.

A cheval de frise was retrieved from the Delaware River in Philadelphia on November 13, 2007, in excellent condition, after more than two centuries in the river. In November 2012, a  spike from a cheval-de-frise was recovered from Delaware off Bristol Township; it was also believed to be from the Revolutionary era installation at Philadelphia and freed up by Hurricane Sandy earlier that fall.

Legacy
A small promontory on the north-east Essex coast in the United Kingdom (UK), between Holland Haven and Frinton-on-Sea, was named Chevaux de Frise Point.

See also
Czech hedgehog

References

Fortification (obstacles)
Medieval defences